A unanimous decision (UD) is a winning criterion in several full-contact combat sports, such as boxing, kickboxing, Muay Thai, mixed martial arts and other sports involving striking and submission in which all three judges agree on which fighter won the match.

In boxing, each of the three judges keep score (round by round) of which fighter they feel is winning (and losing). This only includes landed blows to the head or the body. In MMA, judges look for different criteria such as kicks, take downs, punches, knees, elbows, cage control, submission attempts and aggression. A decision is not required to be unanimous for a boxer or mixed martial artist to be given a victory. In modern era of Olympic boxing, UD is utilized more often than other outcomes including stoppages. Unanimous decision should not be confused with a majority decision or split decision.

History 
In the early days of combat fighting, winners were determined only when one party was unable to continue the fight. The National Sporting Club started to promote professional glove fighting, and introduced the use of officials and their capacity to declare the winner of a fight. Officials began using a scoring system to determine the winner of the fight and this made unanimous decisions a logical outcome.

Any combat sports decision has the potential to be overturned. Some reason for this may include counting errors, misdeclaration, and retroactive disqualification due to rule violations. There has never been a unanimous decision overturned.

Notable unanimous decisions

Controversial unanimous decisions

Notable athletes

Boxing 
 Floyd Mayweather Jr. - 20 wins by UD
 Muhammad Ali - 18 wins by UD
 Manny Pacquiao - 18 wins by UD
 Joe Louis - 9 wins by UD

MMA 
 Jon Jones - 9 wins by UD
 Anderson Silva - 9 wins by UD
 Georges St-Pierre - 10 wins by UD
 Kamaru Usman - 9 wins by UD

See also

10 Point System
Ultimate Fighting Championship
Olympic Games
Split decision
Majority decision
Knockout

References

Boxing rules and regulations
Decision